is a Japanese former football player and manager.

Playing career
Fue was born in Kagoshima Prefecture on February 22, 1973. After graduating from high school, he joined Mazda (later Sanfrecce Hiroshima) in 1991. He played many matches as a forward and offensive midfielder from 1994. The club won second place in the 1994 J1 League and 1995 Emperor's Cup. However, he could hardly play in the match in 1998 and retiredat the  end of the v1998 season. In 2001, he joined the Regional Leagues club  Miyazaki and he came back as playing manager. The club was promoted to the Japan Football League in 2002. He retired at the end of the 2002 season.

Club statistics

References

External links

biglobe.ne.jp

1973 births
Living people
Association football people from Kagoshima Prefecture
Japanese footballers
Japan Soccer League players
J1 League players
Japan Football League players
Sanfrecce Hiroshima players
Estrela Miyazaki players
Japanese football managers
Association football forwards